John Wood Group plc, commonly known as Wood, is a British multinational engineering and consulting business with headquarters in Aberdeen, Scotland. It is listed on the London Stock Exchange as well as being a constituent of the FTSE 250 Index.

History
The business was founded by Ian Wood in 1982, when it split away from JW Holdings, the largest fishing company in Scotland. JW Holdings had diversified into the energy services business at the outset of the North Sea oil industry in the early 1970s.

The company acquired Mustang Engineering Inc, an engineering business based in Houston, Texas in September 2000.

In 2002 the company was listed on the London Stock Exchange.

In March 2017, the company announced it would acquire its rival, Amec Foster Wheeler, in an all stock deal, valued at approximately £2.2 billion. The transaction was completed on 9 October 2017.

In 2020 the nuclear business, mostly decommissioning work at Sellafield, was sold for £250 million to the US Jacobs Engineering Group which has a global nuclear business. The sale will reduce company debt and supports its increasing focus on growing areas like renewables.

The company announced in February 2022 that it would make a loss of approximately US$222million on an anti-missile defence facility for the United States Army Corps of Engineers.

In June 2022, the company announced the sale of its built environment consulting business to WSP Global Inc for approximately US$1.9billion.

Later that month, Wood appointed Ken Gilmartin as its new CEO. Gilmartin joined company in August 2021 as Chief Operating Officer following a 15-year career at Jacobs.

Operations
Wood provides consultation, management of assets and engineering services for the energy and materials sector.

See also 

 List of oilfield service companies
 Sigma3 (2001-2018)

References

External links
 Official website

Engineering companies of Scotland
Energy engineering and contractor companies
Oilfield services companies
Companies based in Aberdeen
Energy companies established in 1982
Non-renewable resource companies established in 1982
1982 establishments in Scotland
Companies listed on the London Stock Exchange
British companies established in 1982
2002 initial public offerings